Oriental Institute of Management (OIM) is affiliated to Mumbai University located in Vashi, Navi Mumbai, Maharashtra, India. This institute was established in 2006 by the parent body Oriental Education Society.

Brief
Oriental Institute of Management, popularly called OIM founded by legendary late Prof. Javed Khan is a premier B-School approved by All India Council of Education (AICTE) - Govt. of India,  Department of Technical Education (DTE) - Govt. of Maharashtra and affiliated to University of Mumbai. OIM offers Master of Management Studies (MMS)-known as MBA course and Doctor of Philosophy (Ph.D.in Management Studies) programs of University of Mumbai. Oriental Institute of Management (OIM) is the only Management Institution in Navi Mumbai having Ph.D. Research Centre approved by University of Mumbai. Oriental Institute of Management (OIM) has prominent faculty, excellent infrastructure and very convenient location having good connectivity to all parts  of Mumbai and MMR region through road and rail network. Oriental Institute of Management is located in Vashi - the main business center of Navi Mumbai

Facilities
OIM's infrastructure includes 
Air-conditioned classrooms 
Large library
Seminar hall equipped with audio-visual (AV)
Computer lab
Wi-fi campus
Amphitheatre
Large lawn
Cafeteria

Academics
The institute offers the following courses:

1. Master of Management Studies (MMS) 
MMS is 2 years full-time post-graduate MBA course with specializations in Marketing, Finance, Human Resources, Operations and Systems (IT).

2. Doctor of Philosophy (Ph.D.) in Management Studies

Admission Criteria
For MMS Program
 Graduate in any discipline
Test Scores of any of the MBA Entrance test namely MH-CET, CAT, XAT, MAT, CMAT or ATMA
For Ph.D. Program
 MMS/MBA/MPhil/CA with 55% marks
 Passes in any of the PhD entrance tests namely NET / SET (Maharashtra)/ PET (University of Mumbai)

External links
 

 Affiliates of the University of Mumbai